"Unravel" is the third song on the album Homogenic by Björk, which was released in 1997. The song features a prominent example of Björk's use of a half-singing, half-speaking technique which, according to folklore specialist Njall Sigurason, is comparable to that of Old Icelandic choirmen.

Composition and themes
Structurally, the song is made up of a slowly sweeping melody, saxophones, a church organ, and distant-sounding electronic beats. Thematically, the song describes two faraway lovers. One of the lovers realizes that the love between the two of them is unraveling because of factors out of their control. The lover, Björk, seeks to reunite with her lover to rebuild the love lost.

Music video
Even though "Unravel" was not released as a single, a music video was made by Lynn Fox to promote Björk's Greatest Hits Tour. The video won a silver prize at the 2004 D&AD Awards, an event recognizing annual achievements in design and advertising. The video itself depicts Björk in a deep sea-like environment, wearing a billowing dress as a large and furry unidentified sea creature grows out of her back in a strings-like manner.

Other artists
In a 2006 interview with Spin, the Radiohead singer Thom Yorke said "Unravel" was his favourite song ever. Radiohead performed a cover of "Unravel" in a 2007 webcast. The Brazilian singer Alice Caymmi released a cover on her 2012 debut album. The Florida sludge metal group Ether Coven covered the song on their 2020 album Everything Is Temporary Except Suffering.

References

Björk songs
Songs written by Guy Sigsworth
Songs written by Björk
1997 songs